In German orthography, the letter ẞ, called   and  ("sharp S"), represents the  phoneme in Standard German when following long vowels and diphthongs. The character's Unicode names in English are sharp s and eszett. The Eszett letter is used only in German, and can be typographically replaced with the double-s digraph , if the ß-character is unavailable. In the 20th century, the ß-character was replaced with ss in the spelling of Swiss Standard German (Switzerland and Liechtenstein), while remaining Standard German spelling in other varieties of German language.

Traditionally,  did not have a capital form, although some type designers introduced de facto capitalized variants.
In 2017, the Council for German Orthography officially adopted a capital, into German orthography, ending a long orthographic debate.

 was encoded by ECMA-94 (1985) at position 223 (hexadecimal DF), inherited by Latin-1 and Unicode.
The HTML entity  &szlig; was introduced with HTML 2.0 (1995). The capital was encoded by ISO 10646 in 2008.

Usage

Current usage
According to current German orthography,  represents the sound :
when a word stem ending with  takes an inflectional ending beginning with a consonant: , .

Some proper names may use  after a short vowel, following the old orthography; this is also true of some words derived from proper names (e.g., named after Ernst Litfaß).

In pre-1996 orthography

According to the orthography in use in German prior to the German orthography reform of 1996,  was written to represent :
word internally following a long vowel or diphthong: , ; and

Substitution and all caps 

Switzerland and Liechtenstein 
In Swiss Standard German,  usually replaces every .   This is officially sanctioned by the reformed German orthography rules, which state in §25 E2: "" ("In Switzerland, one may always write 'ss'").  Liechtenstein follows the same practice.  There are very few instances where the difference between spelling  and  affects the meaning of a word, and these can usually be told apart by context.

Other uses 

Occasionally,  has been used in unusual ways:
 As a surrogate for Greek lowercase  (beta), which looks fairly similar. This was used in older operating systems, the character encoding of which (notably Latin-1 and Windows-1252) did not support easy use of Greek letters.
 In Prussian Lithuanian, as in the first book published in Lithuanian, Martynas Mažvydas' Simple Words of Catechism, as well as in Sorbian (see example on the left).
 For sadhe in Akkadian glosses, in place of the standard , when that character is unavailable due to limitations of HTML.
 The letter appeared in the alphabet made by Jan Kochanowski for Polish language, that was used from 16th until 18th century. It represented the voiceless postalveolar fricative ([ʃ]) sound. It was for example used in Jakub Wujek Bible.

History

Origin and development

Word-internally, Old and Middle High German  came to be pronounced  (the voiced alveolar sibilant), while Old and Middle High German  continued to be pronounced .

The earliest appearance of ligature resembling the modern  is in a fragment of a manuscript of the poem Wolfdietrich from around 1300. A recognizable ligature representing the  digraph develops in handwriting in the early 14th century.

Standardization of use 

In Austria-Hungary prior to the German Orthographic Conference of 1902, an alternative rule formulated by  Johann Christian August Heyse in 1829 had been officially taught in the schools since 1879, although this spelling was not widely used. Heyse's rule matches current usage after the German orthography reform of 1996 in that  was only used after long vowels.

Use in Roman type

Jacob Grimm began using  in his  (1819), however it varied with  word internally. The First Orthographic Conference in Berlin (1876) recommended that ß be represented as  - however, both suggestions were ultimately rejected. In 1879, a proposal for various letter forms was published in the Journal für Buchdruckerkunst. A committee of the Typographic Society of Leipzig chose the "Sulzbacher form". In 1903 it was proclaimed as the new standard for the Eszett in Roman type.

The formal abolition resulted in inconsistencies in how names such as Heuss/Heuß are written in modern German.

Abolition and attempted abolitions
The Swiss and Liechtensteiners ceased to use  in the twentieth century. The Education Council of Zurich had decided to stop teaching the letter in 1935, whereas the Neue Zürcher Zeitung continued to write  until 1971. Swiss newspapers continued to print in Fraktur until the end of the 1940s, and the abandonment of ß by most newspapers corresponded to them switching to Roman typesetting. 

However, Hitler intervened to retain , while deciding against the creation of a capital form.

Development of a capital form

 
Because  had been treated as a ligature, rather than as a full letter of the German alphabet, it had no capital form in early modern typesetting. A capital was first seriously proposed in 1879, but did not enter official or widespread use. Historical typefaces offering a capitalized  mostly date to the time between 1905 and 1930. The first known typefaces to include capital  were produced by the  foundry in Leipzig, in 1905/06.  at the time widely advocated the use of this type, but its use nevertheless remained very limited.

The preface to the 1925 edition of the  dictionary expressed the desirability of a separate glyph for capital :

The  was edited separately in East and West Germany during the 1950s to 1980s. The East German  of 1957 (15th ed.) introduced a capital , in its typesetting without revising the rule for capitalization. The 16th edition of 1969 still announced that an uppercase  was in development and would be introduced in the future.

In the 2000s, there were renewed efforts on the part of certain typographers to introduce a capital, . A proposal to include a corresponding character in the Unicode set submitted in 2004 was rejected. A second proposal submitted in 2007 was successful, and the character was included in Unicode version 5.1.0 in April 2008. The international standard associated with Unicode (UCS), ISO/IEC 10646, was updated to reflect the addition on 24 June 2008. The capital letter was finally adopted as an option in standard German orthography in 2017.

Representation

Graphical variants

The recommendation of the Sulzbacher form (1903) was not followed universally in 20th-century printing. 

 without ligature, but as a single type, with reduced spacing between the two letters;
the Sulzbacher form.
The first variant (no ligature) has become practically obsolete. Most modern typefaces follow either 2 or 4, with 3 retained in occasional usage, notably in street signs in Bonn and Berlin.

Use of typographic variants in street signs:

The inclusion of a capital   in ISO 10646 in 2008 revived the century-old debate among font designers as to how such a character should be represented. The code chart published by the Unicode Consortium favours the former possibility, which has been adopted by Unicode capable fonts including Arial, Calibri, Cambria, Courier New, Dejavu Serif, Liberation Sans, Liberation Mono, Linux Libertine and Times New Roman; the second possibility is more rare, adopted by Dejavu Sans.

Keyboards and encoding 

In Germany and Austria, a 'ß' key is present on computer and typewriter keyboards, normally to the right-hand end on the number row. 
The German typewriter keyboard layout was defined in DIN 2112, first issued in 1928.

In other countries, the letter is not marked on the keyboard, but a combination of other keys can produce it. Often, the letter is input using a modifier and the 's' key. The details of the keyboard layout depend on the input language and operating system: on some keyboards with US-International (or local 'extended') setting, the symbol is created using  (or ) in Microsoft Windows, Linux and ChromeOS; in MacOS, one uses  on the US, US-Extended, and UK keyboards. In Windows, one can use .

Some modern virtual keyboards show ß when the user presses and holds the 's' key.

Its code point in the ISO 8859 character encoding versions 1, 2, 3, 4, 9, 10, 13, 14, 15, 16 and identically in Unicode is 223, or DF in hexadecimal. In TeX and LaTeX, \ss produces ß. A German language support package for LaTeX exists in which ß is produced by "s (similar to umlauts, which are produced by "a, "o, and "u with this package).

In modern browsers, "ß" will be converted to "SS" when the element containing it is set to uppercase using text-transform: uppercase in Cascading Style Sheets. The JavaScript in Google Chrome and Mozilla Firefox will convert "ß" to "SS" when converted to uppercase (e.g., "ß".toUpperCase()).

See also
 long s

Notes

References

German language
Latin-script ligatures